Episyron gallicum is a spider-eating wasp which, as its name suggests, has a distribution centred on France.

Habits
It hunts terrestrial spiders which hunt their prey such as Wolf spiders as opposed to web weaving spiders. The spider is paralysed with a sting and then the helpless spider is sealed in a tunnel and the wasp lays an egg on it. The grub dines on the living spider when it hatches.

Habitat
Open terrain with loose sandy soil.

Distribution
Southern Europe but has recently expanded its range into Poland, Germany and the United Kingdom.

References

External links
Images representing Episyron gallicum at Barcodes of Life

Pompilinae
Hymenoptera of Europe
Insects described in 1889